Kyle Craven (born August 10, 1989), commonly known by his Internet nickname "Bad Luck Brian", is an American Internet celebrity known for his ubiquitous photo posted on Reddit in 2012, which quickly became a popular Internet meme. Bad Luck Brian is an image macro style of meme. His captions describe a variety of unlucky, embarrassing and tragic events.

Meme

Origin 
On January 23, 2012, at 2:15 UTC, Ian Davies uploaded a photo to Reddit of his friend Kyle Craven. Craven and Davies both attended Archbishop Hoban High School in Akron, Ohio. The photo which became Bad Luck Brian was originally taken for the high school's 2005-06 yearbook. Craven stated that he rubbed his face with a sweater to redden it and donned a goofy smile. The high school principal at the time had him retake the photo, but Craven and Davies had already scanned and saved the original picture.
The photo quickly became popular on the image board 4chan, and social media networks like Facebook and Twitter, depicting "a guy who can't catch a break [...] a symbol for a stroke of hilarious bad luck".

Notable depictions 
In 2013, Bad Luck Brian (depicted by Craven himself) featured in a YouTube video sketch alongside fellow meme Overly Attached Girlfriend, where the two characters go on a date. This collaboration prompted Craven to create his own Bad Luck Brian Youtube channel and accounts on Facebook, Instagram and Twitter.

Bad Luck Brian was turned into T-shirts, stuffed animals and novelty items sold by Walmart and Hot Topic. He starred in ad campaigns for companies like Volkswagen. 
In October 2018, Craven did a series of advertisements for McDonald's featuring the Bad Luck Brian character, which were featured on YouTube, Reddit, and Spotify. Including licensing deals and merchandise, Craven estimates he made $20,000 within three years since 2015.

In March 2021, Craven sold a Bad Luck Brian non-fungible token (NFT) for around $36,000.

Personal life 
A Redditor claiming to be Bad Luck Brian attempted to do an AMA thread in the "Ask Me Anything" subreddit on April 11, 2012, but the thread was removed. Craven returned to a different Advice Animals subreddit on May 8, 2012 with an AMA thread.

Craven is the chief operating officer at his father's church construction company.

References

External links 
 

American Internet celebrities
1989 births
People from Cuyahoga Falls, Ohio
Internet memes introduced in 2012
Living people
Kent State University alumni
People notable for being the subject of a specific photograph
2010s photographs
Color photographs